Lira is the unit of currency of various countries.

Specific currencies

Current
 Turkish lira
 Lebanese lira
 Syrian lira
 Pound, translated "lira" in some languages

Former
 Cypriot lira 1879–2007
 French livre 781–1794
 Israeli lira 1948–1980
 Italian lira 1861–2002
 Italian East African lira 1938–1941
 Italian Somaliland lira 1925–1926
 Luccan lira until 1800 and 1826–1847
 Maltese lira 1825–2007
 Neapolitan lira 1812–1813
 Ottoman lira 1844–1923
 Papal lira 1866–1870
 Parman lira before 1802 and 1815–1859
 Sammarinese lira 1860s–2002
 Sardinian lira 1816–1861
 Tripolitanian lira 1943–1951
 Tuscan lira until 1807 and 1814–1826
 Vatican lira 1929–2002
 Venetian lira until 1807

Music
 Lira (Ukrainian instrument), a Ukrainian folk musical instrument similar to the hurdy-gurdy
 Lira da braccio, a European bowed string instrument played during the Renaissance
 Byzantine lyra or lira, a medieval bowed string instrument
 Calabrian lira, a bowed string instrument
 Cretan lyra, a Greek pear-shaped, three-stringed bowed instrument
 Lyre, a string instrument known for its use in Greek classical antiquity and later periods
 Lingm or lira, a Bhutanese flute

People 
 Lira (name), a surname and given name
 Lira (singer) (born 1979), South African singer

Places
 Lira, Salvaterra de Miño, a village in Galicia, northwestern Spain
 Lira, Carnota, a village in Galicia, northwestern Spain
 Lira, Uganda, a town in northern Uganda
 Lira District, an administrative district in northern Uganda
 Lira gas field, in the Black Sea
 Mount Lira, in Antarctica

Other uses
 Lira (mollusc), lines or ridges on the shell of molluscs or brachiopods
 Lira (Encantadia), a fictional character in Encantadia
 Lira (ISS), a communications system
 Lira Airport, in Uganda
 Lira BK, a Swedish football club
 Liberal Reform Party (Czech Republic), a Czech political party
 Locked-in retirement account, a Canadian investment account designed  to hold locked-in pension funds for former plan members
 Alfa class submarine or Lira class submarine
 Ciampino–G. B. Pastine International Airport, in Rome, Italy
 Lira 512, a Yugoslav clone of the IBM PC/XT computer
 Lira-San, a fictional planet in the Star Wars universe

See also
 Lire (disambiguation)
 Liria (disambiguation)
 Lyra (disambiguation)
 Lyre (disambiguation)